Vig Festival is an annual Danish music festival.

History 
Vig festival has been held in Vig since 1995. As of 2007 it has 4 stages, and the headliners of 2007 was Runrig, and Danish acts including Infernal and Thomas Helmig.

External links

 Official site

Music festivals in Denmark
Music festivals established in 1995